Blessed is a BBC television sitcom written by Ben Elton and starring Ardal O'Hanlon as Gary, a record producer, who is struggling to bring up two small children. The only series, of eight episodes, was broadcast on BBC One on Friday evenings at 9.00 pm between October and December 2005. The cast band sang the theme tune – the lullaby "Morningtown Ride".

Cast

Episode guide
The episodes were named after song titles and the groups who sang them:
 I'm So Tired (The Beatles)
 Ever Fallen in Love with Someone (Buzzcocks)
 I'm in Love with My Car (Queen)
 Just Looking (Stereophonics)
 Hit Me Baby One More Time (Britney Spears)
 Who Wrote the Book of Love? (The Monotones)
 Walk Like a Man (The Four Seasons)
 Let's Spend the Night Together (The Rolling Stones)

External links
 Comedy Guide

2005 British television series debuts
2005 British television series endings
2000s British sitcoms
BBC television sitcoms
Television shows written by Ben Elton
English-language television shows
Television series created by Ben Elton